Onesimus Kipchumba Murkomen (born 12 March 1979) is a Kenyan lawyer. He is the Cabinet Secretary for Roads, Transport, and Public works in Kenya. He served as the senator for Elgeyo-Marakwet County from 2013 to 2022.

Early life 
He is the son of Johana Murkomen Kanda and Mama Margaret.

Murkomen studied at Chawis Primary School in Embobut Forest, Marakwet East until 1993 when he sat for his Kenya Certificate of Primary Education (KCPE) exam. He was not satisfied and decided to retake the exam in 1994. He later joined St Joseph’s High School Kitale and transferred to St Patrick's High School Iten, where he sat for the Kenya Certificate of Secondary Education (KCSE) exam. 

In the year 2000 Murkomen joined the University of Nairobi (UoN), Parkland Campus for a Bachelor of Law and graduated with a degree of bachelor of laws (LLB) in 2004. While studying, he was elected chairman of Fellowship of Christian Unions’ National Students Executive Council. He was later awarded a scholarship to study a master’s in law at the University of Pretoria, South Africa. He further studied at the American University Washington College of Law in United States.

Political career 
Murkomen was first elected as Senator for Elgeyo-Marakwet County in 2013 on a United Republican Party (URP) ticket.He vied for the same seat during the 2017 elections, this time on a Jubilee party ticket and was re-elected to a second term. Murkomen was elected majority senate leader in 2013, but he was later replaced by West Pokot Senator Samuel Poghisio as the Senate Majority Leader. in 2020.

Before his nomination as a cabinet minister, Murkomen had been elected for the third time to be the senator for Elgeyo Marakwet County in the 2022 general elections in a UDA party ticket. Murkomen won the seat with a 141,091 votes against his competitor former Elgeyo Marakwet Governor Alex Tolgos who vied under the Jubilee Party and came second. He resigned as the senator in order to take the position of Cabinet Secretary.

Personal life 
Murkomen is married to Gladys Wanjiru Kipchumba and is a father to three sons and a daughter.

References

1979 births
Living people
21st-century Kenyan lawyers
Kenya School of Law alumni
University of Nairobi alumni
University of Pretoria alumni
People from Elgeyo-Marakwet County
Members of the Senate of Kenya
Jubilee Party politicians